Yao Yuan-hao (born Teng Yong-lin on 19 April 1982) is a Taiwanese actor and television host.

Early life and career
Yao was born on April 19, 1982 in Keelung, Taiwan.

He started acting at around 16 years old in the television series Bandits and Angels (1999), directed by Wu Nien-jen, but only became active in 2002. He had his career breakthrough in FTV's 2011 series Rookies' Diary, which received high ratings. The production costs for the series was said to be up to two million TWD, and it also received strong support from the Ministry of Justice. Due to the high expectations, each cast member received training in taekwondo, kendo, and self-defense before shooting began in July.

Two years after Rookies' Diary, he starred opposite Cheryl Yang in Big Red Riding Hood. Screenwriter Su Limei (蘇麗媚) asked him to cut his hair similar to her favorite character in the Japanese manga Musashi no Ken, which would make him look more humorous.

In 2013, Yao starred in five television series, in four of which he portrayed "rich, handsome men".

Personal life
Yao was involved in high profile relationships with actress-model Sonia Sui for 8 years until 2012 and singer Cyndi Wang for 4 years until 2016. Since 2018, he has been dating model Candy Wang.

Yao enjoys skateboarding, surfing, and extreme sports. He usually joins race marathons, including a 42-km marathon during the 'Tokyo Marathon' in February 2013; he was a sports brand ambassador at that time. He also entered the 2013 Taiwan International Surfing Competition.

Philanthropy
In December 2011, he became the ambassador for the Independent Department of Justice held at the '1209 International Anti-Corruption Day', calling people together for the anti-corruption efforts to improve Taiwan. He also became a charity ambassador in Taiwan township schools, promoting traditional Chinese culture to children. In 2015 he volunteered to sell chocolates to raise money for young kids who have brain tumors.

Filmography

Television series

Film

Variety and reality show

Music video appearances

Discography

Singles

Awards and nominations

Notes

References

External links

 

Yao Yuan Hao on Sina Weibo

1982 births
Living people
Taiwanese male television actors
21st-century Taiwanese male actors
Taiwanese male film actors
People from Keelung